Cadham is a precinct in the former new town of Glenrothes in Fife, Scotland. The oldest part of Cadham was once a hamlet and was established to house workers of the nearby Tullis Russell papermills. In the 1970s the Glenrothes Development Corporation expanded the hamlet to become a housing precinct. A neighbourhood shopping centre which takes the name of the village was also established as part of the development. The original section of the Cadham Village is now designated a conservation area.

References

Villages in Fife
Glenrothes